In biology, phylogenetics is the study of the evolutionary history and relationships among or within groups of organisms. These relationships are determined by phylogenetic inference methods that focus on observed heritable traits, such as DNA sequences, protein amino acid sequences, or morphology. The result of such an analysis is a phylogenetic tree—a diagram containing a hypothesis of relationships that reflects the evolutionary history of a group of organisms.

The tips of a phylogenetic tree can be living taxa or fossils, and represent the "end" or the present time in an evolutionary lineage. A phylogenetic diagram can be rooted or unrooted. A rooted tree diagram indicates the hypothetical common ancestor of the tree. An unrooted tree diagram (a network) makes no assumption about the ancestral line, and does not show the origin or "root" of the taxa in question or the direction of inferred evolutionary transformations.

In addition to their use for inferring phylogenetic patterns among taxa, phylogenetic analyses are often employed to represent relationships among genes or individual organisms. Such uses have become central to understanding biodiversity, evolution, ecology, and genomes.

Phylogenetics is part of systematics.

Taxonomy is the identification, naming and classification of organisms. Classifications are now usually based on phylogenetic data, and many systematists contend that only monophyletic taxa should be recognized as named groups. The degree to which classification depends on inferred evolutionary history differs depending on the school of taxonomy: phenetics ignores phylogenetic speculation altogether, trying to represent the similarity between organisms instead; cladistics (phylogenetic systematics) tries to reflect phylogeny in its classifications by only recognizing groups based on shared, derived characters (synapomorphies); evolutionary taxonomy tries to take into account both the branching pattern and "degree of difference" to find a compromise between them.

Even in the field of cancer, phylogenetics makes it possible to study the clonal evolution of tumors and molecular chronology, showing how cell populations vary throughout the progression of the disease, even during treatment, using whole genome sequencing techniques.

Inference of a phylogenetic tree 

Usual methods of phylogenetic inference involve computational approaches implementing the optimality criteria and methods of parsimony, maximum likelihood (ML), and MCMC-based Bayesian inference. All these depend upon an implicit or explicit mathematical model describing the evolution of characters observed.

Phenetics, popular in the mid-20th century but now largely obsolete, used distance matrix-based methods to construct trees based on overall similarity in morphology or similar observable traits (i.e. in the phenotype or the overall similarity of DNA, not the DNA sequence), which was often assumed to approximate phylogenetic relationships.

Prior to 1950, phylogenetic inferences were generally presented as narrative scenarios. Such methods are often ambiguous and lack explicit criteria for evaluating alternative hypotheses.

History 

The term "phylogeny" derives from the German , introduced by Haeckel in 1866, and the Darwinian approach to classification became known as the "phyletic" approach.

Ernst Haeckel's recapitulation theory 

During the late 19th century, Ernst Haeckel's recapitulation theory, or "biogenetic fundamental law", was widely accepted. It was often expressed as "ontogeny recapitulates phylogeny", i.e. the development of a single organism during its lifetime, from germ to adult, successively mirrors the adult stages of successive ancestors of the species to which it belongs. But this theory has long been rejected. Instead, ontogeny evolves – the phylogenetic history of a species cannot be read directly from its ontogeny, as Haeckel thought would be possible, but characters from ontogeny can be (and have been) used as data for phylogenetic analyses; the more closely related two species are, the more apomorphies their embryos share.

Timeline of key points 

14th century, lex parsimoniae (parsimony principle), William of Ockam, English philosopher, theologian, and Franciscan friar, but the idea actually goes back to Aristotle, precursor concept
1763, Bayesian probability, Rev. Thomas Bayes, precursor concept
18th century, Pierre Simon (Marquis de Laplace), perhaps first to use ML (maximum likelihood), precursor concept
1809, evolutionary theory, Philosophie Zoologique, Jean-Baptiste de Lamarck, precursor concept, foreshadowed in the 17th century and 18th century by Voltaire, Descartes, and Leibniz, with Leibniz even proposing evolutionary changes to account for observed gaps suggesting that many species had become extinct, others transformed, and different species that share common traits may have at one time been a single race, also foreshadowed by some early Greek philosophers such as Anaximander in the 6th century BC and the atomists of the 5th century BC, who proposed rudimentary theories of evolution
1837, Darwin's notebooks show an evolutionary tree
1843, distinction between homology and analogy (the latter now referred to as homoplasy), Richard Owen, precursor concept
1858, Paleontologist Heinrich Georg Bronn (1800–1862) published a hypothetical tree to illustrating the paleontological "arrival" of new, similar species following the extinction of an older species. Bronn did not propose a mechanism responsible for such phenomena, precursor concept.
1858, elaboration of evolutionary theory, Darwin and Wallace, also in Origin of Species by Darwin the following year, precursor concept
1866, Ernst Haeckel, first publishes his phylogeny-based evolutionary tree, precursor concept
1893, Dollo's Law of Character State Irreversibility, precursor concept
1912, ML recommended, analyzed, and popularized by Ronald Fisher, precursor concept
1921, Tillyard uses term "phylogenetic" and distinguishes between archaic and specialized characters in his classification system
1940, term "clade" coined by Lucien Cuénot
1949, Jackknife resampling, Maurice Quenouille (foreshadowed in '46 by Mahalanobis and extended in '58 by Tukey), precursor concept
1950, Willi Hennig's classic formalization
1952, William Wagner's groundplan divergence method
1953, "cladogenesis" coined
1960, "cladistic" coined by Cain and Harrison
1963, first attempt to use ML (maximum likelihood) for phylogenetics, Edwards and Cavalli-Sforza
1965
Camin-Sokal parsimony, first parsimony (optimization) criterion and first computer program/algorithm for cladistic analysis both by Camin and Sokal
character compatibility method, also called clique analysis, introduced independently by Camin and Sokal (loc. cit.) and E. O. Wilson
1966
English translation of Hennig
"cladistics" and "cladogram" coined (Webster's, loc. cit.)
1969
dynamic and successive weighting, James Farris
Wagner parsimony, Kluge and Farris
CI (consistency index), Kluge and Farris
introduction of pairwise compatibility for clique analysis, Le Quesne
1970, Wagner parsimony generalized by Farris
1971
first successful application of ML to phylogenetics (for protein sequences), Neyman
Fitch parsimony, Fitch
NNI (nearest neighbour interchange), first branch-swapping search strategy, developed independently by Robinson and Moore et al.
ME (minimum evolution), Kidd and Sgaramella-Zonta (it is unclear if this is the pairwise distance method or related to ML as Edwards and Cavalli-Sforza call ML "minimum evolution")
1972, Adams consensus, Adams
1976, prefix system for ranks, Farris
1977, Dollo parsimony, Farris
1979
Nelson consensus, Nelson
MAST (maximum agreement subtree)((GAS)greatest agreement subtree), a consensus method, Gordon
bootstrap, Bradley Efron, precursor concept
1980, PHYLIP, first software package for phylogenetic analysis, Felsenstein
1981
majority consensus, Margush and MacMorris
strict consensus, Sokal and Rohlf
first computationally efficient ML algorithm, Felsenstein
1982
PHYSIS, Mikevich and Farris
branch and bound, Hendy and Penny
1985
first cladistic analysis of eukaryotes based on combined phenotypic and genotypic evidence Diana Lipscomb
first issue of Cladistics
first phylogenetic application of bootstrap, Felsenstein
first phylogenetic application of jackknife, Scott Lanyon
1986, MacClade, Maddison and Maddison
1987, neighbor-joining method Saitou and Nei
1988, Hennig86 (version 1.5), Farris
Bremer support (decay index), Bremer
1989
RI (retention index), RCI (rescaled consistency index), Farris
HER (homoplasy excess ratio), Archie
1990
combinable components (semi-strict) consensus, Bremer
SPR (subtree pruning and regrafting), TBR (tree bisection and reconnection), Swofford and Olsen
1991
DDI (data decisiveness index), Goloboff
first cladistic analysis of eukaryotes based only on phenotypic evidence, Lipscomb
1993, implied weighting Goloboff
1994, reduced consensus: RCC (reduced cladistic consensus) for rooted trees, Wilkinson
1995, reduced consensus RPC (reduced partition consensus) for unrooted trees, Wilkinson
1996, first working methods for BI (Bayesian Inference)independently developed by Li, Mau, and Rannala and Yang and all using MCMC (Markov chain-Monte Carlo)
1998, TNT (Tree Analysis Using New Technology), Goloboff, Farris, and Nixon
1999, Winclada, Nixon
2003, symmetrical resampling, Goloboff
2004,2005, similarity metric (using an approximation to Kolmogorov complexity) or NCD (normalized compression distance), Li et al., Cilibrasi and Vitanyi.

Outside biology 
Phylogenetic tools and representations (trees and networks) can also be applied to studying the evolution of languages, in the field of quantitative comparative linguistics.

See also 

 Angiosperm Phylogeny Group
 Bauplan
 Bioinformatics
 Biomathematics
 Coalescent theory
 EDGE of Existence programme
 Evolutionary taxonomy
 Language family
 Maximum parsimony
 Microbial phylogenetics
 Molecular phylogeny
 Noogenesis
 Ontogeny
 PhyloCode
 Phylodynamics
 Phylogenesis
 Phylogenetic comparative methods
 Phylogenetic network
 Phylogenetic nomenclature
 Phylogenetic tree viewers
 Phylogenetics software
 Phylogenomics
 Phylogeny (psychoanalysis)
 Phylogeography
 Systematics

References

Bibliography

External links